"Never Say Never" is a song by Dutch disc jockey and record producer Armin van Buuren. It features vocals and lyrics from Dutch singer and songwriter Jacqueline Govaert. The song was released in the Netherlands by Armind on 29 June 2009 as the fifth and last single from van Buuren's third studio album Imagine.

Music video 
A music video to accompany the release of "Never Say Never" was first released onto YouTube on 18 June 2009. The music video contains extracts from van Buuren's and Govaert's performances during Armin Only: Imagine tour shows.

Track listing 
 Netherlands – Armada digital / Armada – digital download & CD 
 "Never Say Never" (radio edit) – 2:53
 "Never Say Never" (extended mix) – 7:03
 "Never Say Never" (Alex Gaudino remix) – 6:53
 "Never Say Never" (Myon & Shane 54 remix) – 7:54
 "Never Say Never" (Omnia remix) – 7:35

 Netherlands – Armind – 12" 
 "Never Say Never" (extended mix) – 7:02
 "Never Say Never" (Myon & Shane 54 remix) – 7:54
 "Never Say Never" (Alex Gaudino remix) – 6:53

 Netherlands – Armind – digital download 
 "Never Say Never" (extended mix) – 7:03
 "Never Say Never" (Myon & Shane 54 remix) – 7:54
 "Never Say Never" (Omnia remix) – 7:33
 "Never Say Never" (Alex Gaudino remix) – 6:53
 "Never Say Never" (Alex Gaudino dub) – 6:54

 Belgium – Mostiko – CD single "Unforgivable" (radio edit) – 2:53
 "Unforgivable" (Alex Gaudino remix) – 6:53

 Netherlands – Armind – digital download Namatjira remix '''
 "Never Say Never" (Namatjira remix) – 3:30

Charts

References 

2009 singles
Armin van Buuren songs
2009 songs
Songs written by Armin van Buuren
Armada Music singles
Songs written by Benno de Goeij